is a passenger railway station in the city of Kiryū, Gunma, Japan, operated by the private railway operator Jōmō Electric Railway Company. Travelers looking for Mount Fuji should be careful not to mistakenly come to this station. Fujiyamashita Station is around 200 km and two prefectures away from Japan's most famous mountain. The name means "The bottom of Fuji Mountain" and when written in kanji characters is identical to Mount Fuji, but does not have any relation to the popular tourist destination.

Lines

Station layout
Fujiyamashita Station consists of one side platform serving traffic in both directions. The station is unattended.

Adjacent stations

History
Fujiyamashita Station was opened on November 10, 1928.

Passenger statistics
In fiscal 2019, the station was used by an average of 85 passengers daily (boarding passengers only).

Surrounding area
 Watarase River

See also
 List of railway stations in Japan

References

External links

  
	

Stations of Jōmō Electric Railway
Railway stations in Gunma Prefecture
Railway stations in Japan opened in 1928
Kiryū, Gunma